Agdistis korana is a moth in the family Pterophoridae. It is known from Kenya.

References

Endemic moths of Kenya
Agdistinae
Moths of Africa
Moths described in 1988